The Edward Appleton Medal and Prize is awarded by the Institute of Physics for distinguished research in environmental, earth or atmospheric physics.  Originally named after Charles Chree, the British physicist and former President of the Physical Society of London, it was renamed in 2008 to commemorate Edward Victor Appleton, winner of the Nobel prize for proving the existence of the ionosphere.

History

The prize was established in 1941 by Chree's sister, Jessie, after his death, and it was originally awarded biennially. It was first awarded to Sydney Chapman. From 2001 it was awarded annually. After the 2008 renaming the prize was awarded in even-dated years until 2016, then as and when required.

The cash prize part of the award has risen in value since its inception, reported at £150 in 1985 and £300 in 1987, to its present-day value of £1000.

Winners

Recipients of the Appleton medal and prize
 
2019 Cathryn Mitchell
2016 Giles Harrison
2014 David Marshall
2012 Colin O'Dowd
2010 Myles Allen
2008 Ann Wintle

Recipients of the Chree medal and prize

See also
 Institute of Physics Awards
 List of physics awards
 List of awards named after people

References

Awards established in 2008
Chree medal and prize
Awards of the Institute of Physics
Earth sciences